Emmanuel Janssen (1879–1955) was a Belgian businessman, who founded the Union Chimique Belge (UCB) in Brussels, Belgium, in 1928. UCB was one of the first companies in the world to distill ammonia from coal.

References

Businesspeople from Brussels
1879 births
1955 deaths